Nyanga is a township in the Western Cape, South Africa. Its name in Xhosa means "moon" and it is one of the oldest black townships in Cape Town. It was established as a result of the migrant labour system. In 1948 black migrants were forced to settle in Nyanga as Langa had become too small. Nyanga was one of the poorest places in Cape Town and is still is one of the most dangerous parts of Cape Town. In 2001 its unemployment rate was estimated at being approximately 56%  and HIV/AIDS is a huge community issue.

History
The neighbourhood was established in 1946 and, in the same year, was proclaimed a township for migrant labour predominantly from the Eastern Cape. It was initially established as a spillover once the neighbourhood of Langa was fully occupied.

Residents of Nyanga were active in joining a national call to protest against the apartheid laws passed in 1960. Later they were active in the 1976 student uprisings, which had begun on the other side of the country on 16 June 1976 in Soweto against the use of Afrikaans as the primary medium of instruction in schools. Nyanga became notorious for its black-on-black faction fighting that was allegedly perpetrated by police in the early eighties. The local authorities (izibonda) grouped themselves according to their background and used that as their criteria when allocating land.

These cultural differences were allegedly used by the police to stir up violence, and elements of the community were infiltrated by the apartheid regime. This led to emergence of the notoriously violent group called "the witdoeke" (the white scarfs). As a result of these fights Tambo square was formed.

Nyanga comprises nine township subdivisions: Lusaka, KTC, Old Location, Maumau, Zwelitsha, Maholweni "Hostels", White City, Barcelona, Kanana, and Europe.

Government institutions and public services
Several government institutions maintain a presence in Nyanga in order to provide various vital services to the community:
Nyanga Home Affairs Office
The South African Department of Labour has a satellite office in Nyanga.
The Nyanga Community Health Clinic
Masincedane Clinic
Nyanga Police Station
Nyanga Public Library loans books to the community and provides several useful informational services.

Churches
Some of the churches that are located in Nyanga are:
 Apostolic Church
 Assembly of God Nyanga
 FH Gow AME Church
 Fresh Fire Church
 Holy Cross Anglican Church
 New Crossroads Baptist Church
 Reformed Gospel Church
 St Mary's Catholic Church
 Trinity society Church

See also
Goldstone Commission

References

Suburbs of Cape Town
Townships in the Western Cape